Paniqui, officially the Municipality of Paniqui, is a 1st class municipality in the province of Tarlac, Philippines. According to the 2020 census, it has a population of 103,003 people. It is the birthplace of the 11th President of the Philippines, Corazon Aquino.

Etymology
Paniqui is a Hispanized term derived from the Ilocano word "pampaniki" which means "bat", since the town has caves that house bats.

History

The birth of Paniqui could be traced way back in 1712 when the provincial government of Pangasinan sent a group of men south of Bayambang, Pangasinan for the expansion of the Christian faith. The pioneering group was led by two brothers, Raymundo and Manuel Paragas of Dagupan and established the Local Government in a Sitio called "manggang marikit" (mango of an unmarried woman). Surprisingly, in this sitio, there is a great number of mammals called by Ilocanos "pampaniki" and it was from this term that the name Paniqui was derived.

It was a historical sitio where the first Filipino Moro, Sultan Ali Mudin, was baptized in 1750.

Paniqui was a sprawling town that covered a wide area that time. Some of the barrios that formerly comprised Paniqui were "San Roque", now Cuyapo; "Barong", now Gerona; "San Jose De Camiling", now Camiling; "Bani", now Ramos; "San Ramon", now Moncada; and Anao.

The period between 1750 and 1896 were painful years of Spanish tyranny and oppression because the insurrectos and sometimes bandits, who are conveniently sprouted among the people, made sporadic attacks upon the conquistadores. These attacks on the Spaniards, who came on the islands bringing the sword and the cross, were marred by cholera and smallpox epidemics punctuated by floods and typhoons.

However, a group of Paniqui patriots, welded together by a common belief of oneness, unselfish devotion for freedom and who were spurred by ruthless Spanish tyranny, organized a legitimate segment of the Katipunan on January 12, 1896, which is a far cry from the bandits that used to harass the Spaniards.

These dauntless men made daring exploits, unrecorded in the history of the Katipunan, the most prominent of which was the ambuscade of Spanish soldiers along the road going to Anao and killing a great number of them. These incidents made a prelude to the end of the Spanish occupation in Paniqui.

The advent of American occupation saw a happy transition from the almost aristocratic and enigmatic characteristic of Spanish conquistadores to the democratic way of life under American tutelage.

Geography
Paniqui is situated between the towns of Gerona in the south, Moncada in the north, Anao and Ramos in the east while Camiling and Santa Ignacia are to its west.

The town was originally part of the province of Pangasinan. It is first known as Manggang Marikit, a sitio of Pangasinan, in 1571 and as Pampaniki in 1686.

Barangays
Paniqui is politically subdivided into 35 barangays.

Climate

Demographics

Language
The language predominantly spoken is Ilocano, but Tagalog, Kapampangan and Pangasinan are also used frequently.

Economy

References

External links

Paniqui Profile at PhilAtlas.com
[ Philippine Standard Geographic Code]
Philippine Census Information

Municipalities of Tarlac